Erwin Peter Nytz or Edward Piotr Nyc (24 May 1914 – 1 May 1988) was an interwar Polish football midfielder.

Nytz was born 24 May 1914 in Kattowitz (Katowice), German Empire (now Poland). In the late 1930s, Nyc played for Polonia Warszawa, and also represented the Poland national football team. He participated in the legendary 1938 FIFA World Cup game Poland - Brazil 5-6 (5 June 1938 in Strasbourg, France).   
 
During the Second World War, Nyc returned to Upper Silesia, where for a while played for a German minority team 1. FC Katowice. Called up to the German Army, continued his career in the military teams of the Luftwaffe and the garrison of Berlin.

After the war Nyc unlike many of his fellow Silesian-German soccer players remained in his homeland under Communist Poland. Initially, he had many problems with the Communist government, which regarded him as a traitor. However, a group of players from Kraków and Warsaw claimed that he had never betrayed Poland and had actively supported Polish underground organizations.

Name
Born Erwin Nytz, after the restoration of Poland's sovereignty he changed his last name back to its Polish version. During the Second World War his last name was again Germanized. After the war this change was annulled.

See also
 Polish Roster in World Cup Soccer France 1938

References

1914 births
1988 deaths
Polish footballers
Polonia Warsaw players
1938 FIFA World Cup players
Sportspeople from Katowice
Poland international footballers
People from the Province of Silesia
German Army personnel of World War II
Association football midfielders
Luftwaffe personnel of World War II